Afanasovo is a rural locality (a village) in Kiprevskoye Rural Settlement, Kirzhachsky District, Vladimir Oblast, Russia. The population was 368 as of 2010. There are 6 streets.

Geography 
Afanasovo is located 21 km northeast of Kirzhach (the district's administrative centre) by road. Kudrino is the nearest rural locality.

References 

Rural localities in Kirzhachsky District